Sassy Ross is a poet. Born in Saint Lucia, she lives in New York City.

Early life
Ross was born in Castries, Saint Lucia. She lived her early years in the Caribbean and grew up speaking a mixture of English and French patois. When she was ten years old she moved to the United States, arriving in Virginia. She attended Pennsylvania State University and began writing poetry. She moved to New York and received her Master of Fine Arts degree in poetry from New York University (NYU).

Career
While studying poetry at NYU, Ross was nominated for a Ruth Lilly Poetry Fellowship. She later taught Creative Writing at NYU, and also taught high school English at the Student Center program in New Orleans, where she was a member of the Nommo Literary Workshop. She also served as the managing editor of Calabash, a NYU publication.

Her work has appeared in Prairie Schooner, Caribbean Beat, the Caribbean Review of Books, Calabash: A Journal of Caribbean Arts and Letters, Poetry International, Kalliope, online journals such as Mélange and Timbooktu, and Coming Up Hot, an anthology of Caribbean poets. She received second place in the Katey Lehman Creative Writing contest.

Work
Sassy Ross's poems focus on a nostalgia for the past, the geography, and the languages and voices she left behind in the Caribbean. Her poems recall the landscapes of St. Lucia, and explore the central themes of home in relation to her departure, and return, also examining her relationships with her parents, displacement, language, conflict, and trauma, both from the perils of the island and her past.

References

Sources
 Dawes, Kwame Senu Neville. Coming up Hot: Eight New Poets from the Caribbean. Leeds, United Kingdom: Peekash, 2015. Print.
 
 
 

Year of birth missing (living people)
Living people
Pennsylvania State University alumni
People from Castries Quarter
Saint Lucian women poets